The Aurora Awards are granted annually by the Canadian SF and Fantasy Association and SFSF Boreal Inc. The Award for Best Poem/Song was first awarded in 2011 when the Prix Aurora and Prix Boreal merged into one. Previously, poems had been recognized under the Best Short Fiction category, and songs had been nominated in the Best Related Work category. The award is only granted in the English-language Awards, with the equivalent awards for French-language poetry coming under the Best Short Fiction category, and music coming under the Best Audiovisual Artistic Creation category (which does not have a direct English-language equivalent).

No award was given in 2017, as there were insufficient nominations.

Winners and nominees

  *   Winners and joint winners

References

Aurora Awards